America and the Armenian Genocide of 1915 is a 2003 non-fiction book written and edited by Jay Winter and published by Cambridge University Press.

See also
 Ottoman Empire-United States relations

References

Further reading
  - This is one of the reviewed works

External links
 America and the Armenian Genocide of 1915 - Online copy at Cambridge University Press (access restricted)

Cambridge University Press
2003 non-fiction books
Non-fiction books about the Armenian genocide
Ottoman Empire–United States relations